Dicepolia amazonalis is a moth in the family Crambidae. It was described by James E. Hayden in 2009. It is found in the central Amazon basin, along the main trunk of the Amazon River and its tributaries.

The length of the forewings is 7.8–9 mm. The forewings are brown, with reddish at the distal veins. The costa and lines are dark brown. The hindwings are pale brownish bronze with a brown termen. Adults have been recorded on wing in February, from July to August and in September.

Etymology
The species name refers to the distribution.

References

Moths described in 2009
Odontiinae